Spoon is a Philippine noontime cooking and celebrity talk show. The show has premiered on March 25, 2007, and hosted by Janice de Belen until it ended for eight years in 2015 on Net 25. It was relaunched with the slogan "I Am One With 25". The show uses a talk show premise with its celebrity guests while they are cooking meals with the host. Eddie Garcia and Dolphy are among the celebrity guests in the show.

Awards and nominations

References

See also
List of programs previously broadcast by Net 25

Philippine television talk shows
2007 Philippine television series debuts
2015 Philippine television series endings
Net 25 original programming
Filipino-language television shows